Suddenly Last Summer is a one-act play by Tennessee Williams, written in New York in 1957. It opened off Broadway on January 7, 1958, as part of a double bill with another of Williams' one-acts, Something Unspoken (written in London in 1951). The presentation of the two plays was given the overall title Garden District, but Suddenly Last Summer is now more often performed alone. Williams said he thought the play "perhaps the most poetic" he had written, and Harold Bloom ranks it among the best examples of the playwright's lyricism.

Plot 
1936, in the Garden District of New Orleans. Mrs. Violet Venable, an elderly socialite widow from a prominent local family, has invited a doctor to her home. She talks nostalgically about her son Sebastian, a poet, who died under mysterious circumstances in Spain the previous summer. During the course of their conversation, she offers to make a generous donation to support the doctor's psychiatric research if he will perform a lobotomy on Catharine, her niece, who has been confined to St. Mary, a private mental asylum, at her expense since returning to America. Mrs. Venable is eager to "shut her up" once and for all, as she continues to babble about Sebastian's violent death and smash her son's reputation by hinting at his homosexuality.

Catharine arrives, followed by her mother and brother. They are also eager to suppress her version of events, since Mrs. Venable is threatening to keep Sebastian's will in probate until she is satisfied, something Catharine's family can't afford to challenge. But the doctor injects Catharine with a truth serum and she proceeds to give a scandalous account of Sebastian's moral dissolution and the events leading up to his death, how he used her to procure young men for his sexual exploitation, and how he was set upon, mutilated, and partially devoured by a mob of starving children in the street. Mrs. Venable lunges at Catharine but is prevented from striking her with her cane. She is taken off stage, screaming "cut this hideous story from her brain!" Far from being convinced of Catharine's insanity, however, the doctor concludes the play by stating he believes her story could be true.

Analysis 
From its first page, the script is rich in symbolic detail open to many interpretations. The "mansion of Victorian Gothic style" immediately connects the play with Southern Gothic literature, with which it shares many characteristics. Sebastian's "jungle-garden," with its "violent" colours and noises of "beasts, serpents, and birds ... of savage nature" introduces the images of predation that punctuate much of the play's dialogue. These have been interpreted variously as implying the violence latent in Sebastian himself; depicting modernity's vain attempts to "contain" its atavistic impulses; and standing for a bleak "Darwinian" vision of the world, equating "the primeval past and the ostensibly civilised present."

The Venus flytrap mentioned in the play's opening speech can be read as portraying Sebastian as the "pampered" son, or "hungry for flesh"; as portraying the "seductive deadliness" concealed beneath Mrs. Venable's "civilized veneer," while she "clings desperately to life" in her "hothouse" home; as a joint "metaphor for Violet and Sebastian, who consume and destroy the people around them"; as symbolising nature's cruelty, like the "flesh-eating birds" of the Galapagos; as symbolising "a primitive state of desire," and so on.

Williams referred to symbols as "the natural language of drama" and "the purest language of plays." The ambiguity arising from the abundance of symbolism is therefore not unfamiliar to his audiences. What poses a unique difficulty to critics of Suddenly Last Summer is the absence of its protagonist. All we can know of Sebastian must be gleaned from the conflicting accounts given by two characters of questionable sanity, leaving him "a figure of unresolvable contradiction."

In spite of its difficulties, however, the play's recurrent images of predation and cannibalism point to Catharine's cynical pronouncement as key to understanding the playwright's intentions: "we all use each other," she says in Scene 4, "and that's what we think of as love." Accordingly, Williams commented on a number of occasions that Sebastian's death was intended to show how:
Man devours man in a metaphorical sense. He feeds upon his fellow creatures, without the excuse of animals. Animals actually do it for survival, out of hunger ... I use that metaphor [of cannibalism] to express my repulsion with this characteristic of man, the way people use each other without conscience ... people devour each other.

Adaptations and productions

1958 original production 
The original production of the play was performed off Broadway on  January 7, 1958, along with Something Unspoken, under the collective title of Garden District, at the York Theatre on First Avenue in New York, staged by the York Playhouse. Anne Meacham won an Obie Award (Annual Off-Broadway Theatre Awards 1956 –) for her performance as Catharine. The production also featured Hortense Alden as Mrs. Venable, Robert Lansing as Dr. Cukrowicz, Eleanor Phelps as Mrs. Holly, and Alan Mixon as George Holly, and was directed by Herbert Machiz, with stage set designed by Robert Soule and the costumes by Stanley Simmons. Incidental music was by Ned Rorem.

1959 film 

The film version was released by Columbia Pictures, in 1959, starring Elizabeth Taylor, Katharine Hepburn, and Montgomery Clift; it was directed by Joseph L. Mankiewicz from a screenplay by Gore Vidal and Williams. The movie differed greatly from the stage version, adding many scenes, characters, and subplots. The Hollywood Production Code forced the filmmakers to cut out the explicit references to homosexuality.

The movie received three Academy Awards nominations: Hepburn and Taylor were both nominated for Best Actress in a Leading Role, and it was also up for Best Art Direction-Set Decoration, Black-and-White.

1993 BBC TV play 
The play was adapted for BBC television in 1993 under the direction of Royal National Theatre head Richard Eyre, and starring Maggie Smith, Rob Lowe, Richard E. Grant, and Natasha Richardson. It aired in America on PBS as an episode of Great Performances. Smith was nominated for an Emmy Award for Outstanding Actress in a Miniseries or TV Movie. According to Lowe, his personal driver during the production of the telefilm was also the personal driver for Montgomery Clift on the 1959 film.

1995 Broadway debut 
The play made its Broadway debut in 1995. It was performed together with Something Unspoken, the other one-act play that it originally appeared with under the title Garden District. It was presented by the Circle in the Square Theatre. The cast included Elizabeth Ashley, Victor Slezak and Celia Weston.

1999 London West End debut 
The play debuted on the  West End in 1999 at the Comedy Theatre, London, starring Sheila Gish as Mrs. Venable, Rachel Weisz as Catharine, Gerard Butler as Dr. Cukrowicz and directed by Sean Mathias.

2004 London West End revival 
Michael Grandage directed a 2004 stage production at the Lyceum Theatre, Sheffield, featuring Diana Rigg as Mrs. Venable and Victoria Hamilton as Catharine. The production toured nationally before transferring to the Albery Theatre, London. The production received enthusiastic reviews, and Hamilton won the Evening Standard Award for Best Actress in a Play for her performance.

2006 off-Broadway 
An off-Broadway production in 2006 by the Roundabout Theatre Company starred Blythe Danner, Gale Harold and Carla Gugino.

2015 Sydney Theatre Company 
The play was part of the 2015 season at the Sydney Theatre Company. Director Kip Williams blended live camera work with traditional stage craft in a production starring Eryn Jean Norvill as Catherine and Robyn Nevin as Venable. The production received three nominations at 2015 Helpmann Awards, with Nevin nominated for Best Actress, the production nominated for Best Play, and Williams winning for Best Director.

2017 Théâtre de l'Odéon, Paris 
A French translation of the play was staged at the Théâtre de l'Odéon in March and April 2017. Stéphane Braunschweig directed Luce Mouchel as Mrs. Venable, Marie Rémond as Catherine, Jean-Baptiste Anoumon as Dr. Cukrowicz, Océane Cairaty as Miss Foxhill, Virginie Colemyn as Mrs. Holly, Glenn Marausse as George, and Boutaïna El Fekkak as Sœur Félicité.

Footnotes

References

External links 
 
 
 

1958 plays
American plays adapted into films
LGBT-related plays
Off-Broadway plays
Plays by Tennessee Williams
Plays set in New Orleans
Plays set in the 1930s
Cannibalism in fiction